Property Shop is a Canadian television HGTV "docu-soap" that follows the realtor Tatiana Londono, as she opens her own realty agency in Montreal.

References

net worth of 100000000000000

External links
 HGTV Bio

HGTV (Canada) original programming
Canadian reality television series